Lucia Kay McBath (née Holman; born June 1, 1960) is an American politician serving as the U.S. representative from Georgia's 7th congressional district. The district is based in Gwinnett County. McBath is a member of the Democratic Party.

McBath's son, Jordan Davis, was murdered in November 2012. She then became an advocate for gun control, joining other mothers of black murder victims to form the Mothers of the Movement, and spoke at the 2016 Democratic National Convention. 

McBath ran for the House of Representatives in 2018, defeating Republican incumbent Karen Handel and defeating her again in 2020. McBath switched to the 7th district after redistricting in 2020 made the 6th significantly more favorable to Republicans; she defeated the 7th's incumbent, Carolyn Bourdeaux, in the Democratic primary and won the general election.

Early life and career 
McBath was born in Joliet, Illinois, on June 1, 1960. Her father, Lucien Holman, was a dentist who owned The Black Voice, an African-American newspaper, and served as president of the NAACP's Illinois chapter. Her mother, Wilma, worked as a nurse. Lucy has a sister, Lori.

McBath attended Virginia State University and graduated with a bachelor's degree in political science in 1982. After college, she worked as an intern for former Virginia governor Douglas Wilder. In the 1990s, she became a flight attendant for Delta Air Lines and relocated to Atlanta, where Delta is headquartered.

Political activism 

In 2012, McBath's 17-year-old son, Jordan Davis, was shot and killed following an argument at a gas station in Florida about loud music. The shooting and its aftermath received national attention, and prompted discussion about controversial self-defense laws, commonly known as stand-your-ground laws. Her son's killer, Michael Dunn, was convicted of first-degree murder and was sentenced to life in prison without the possibility of parole.

Following her son's death, McBath joined Moms Demand Action for Gun Sense in America as a national spokeswoman. She attended a speech by President Barack Obama on gun violence at the White House and supported the My Brother's Keeper Challenge. McBath also joined the gun control advocacy group Mothers of the Movement, which consists of African American women whose children have been killed by gun violence. McBath opposed campus carry legislation in Florida.

McBath campaigned actively for Hillary Clinton in the 2016 presidential election and spoke on her behalf at the 2016 Democratic National Convention.

McBath created a foundation, Champion In The Making Legacy, to help high school graduates continue their education and training.

McBath appeared in a 2015 documentary film, 3 1/2 Minutes, 10 Bullets, that explored her son's shooting. She also appeared in the 2015 documentary film The Armor of Light, in which Rob Schenck, an anti-abortion Evangelical minister, discusses gun violence in America; The Armor of Light won an Emmy Award for Outstanding Social Issue Documentary.

U.S. House of Representatives

Elections

2018 

McBath credits her decision to run for office to a meeting with State Representative Renitta Shannon, who urged her to run. Several other factors contributed to her decision, including the election of Donald Trump and the undoing of previously enacted gun control measures.

After initially planning to run for the Georgia House of Representatives against incumbent Republican Sam Teasley in 2018, she decided after the Stoneman Douglas High School shooting to instead challenge Karen Handel, the incumbent Republican in the United States House of Representatives representing .

Although the 6th has historically tilted Republican, Handel was thought to be vulnerable. Trump barely carried the district in 2016. Handel defeated Jon Ossoff in a hotly contested 2017 special election that remains the most expensive U.S. House race in American history.

In the Democratic Party primary election on May 22, McBath led all challengers with 36% of the vote. She defeated Kevin Abel, the second-place finisher, in the July 24 runoff election with 53.7% of the vote.

McBath faced Handel in the November general election and declared victory with 159,268 votes, surpassing Handel's 156,396 with 100% of precincts reporting. She became the first Democrat to represent this district since it moved to Atlanta's northern suburbs in 1993. Indeed, she was the first Democrat to garner even 40% of the vote in a general election for the district since Gingrich left office in 1999. A number of reports described McBath as the first Democrat to represent this district since Gingrich won it in 1978. But for his first seven terms, Gingrich represented a district that stretched across a swath of exurban and rural territory south and west of Atlanta; he transferred to the reconfigured 6th after the 1990 census.

The Atlanta Journal-Constitution called McBath's victory "the biggest Georgia Democratic upset of the 2018 midterms."

2020 

McBath was discussed as a possible candidate in the 2020 Georgia Senate special election. According to The Hill, Democrats considered her "one of the top potential contenders" for the seat. But she declined to run for that office, saying she preferred to continue focusing on her work in the House.

McBath raised $620,000 in the fourth quarter of 2019. As of the end of 2019, she had $1.3 million cash on hand for her reelection bid. 93% of her contributions came from small-dollar donors.

She won the November 3 general election with 54.2% of the vote in a rematch against Karen Handel. She got a significant boost from Joe Biden carrying the district with 55% of the vote, the first time a Democrat had carried the district at the presidential level in its 2013–2022 configuration as a northern suburban district.

2022 

In the 2021 redistricting session, McBath's district was significantly altered by Republican state legislators. Its share of heavily Democratic DeKalb County was cut out, replaced by conservative exurban counties such as Forsyth and Cherokee. The new configuration shifts the district from one that voted for Biden by double digits to one that voted for Trump by double digits, likely securing the seat for Republicans in the 2022 elections. Reports speculated that McBath could run in another district.

In November 2021, McBath announced that she would run for reelection in the 7th district. Currently held by fellow Democrat Carolyn Bourdeaux, the district absorbed most of the more Democratic portions of the old 6th in redistricting, making it significantly bluer than its predecessor. McBath defeated Bordeaux in the Democratic primary.

Tenure
McBath cosponsored the Honoring American Veterans in Extreme Need ("HAVEN") Act, which gives disabled veterans bankruptcy protections.

McBath co-sponsored legislation to extend Pell Grant eligibility to college students if their school closed or if school officials committed institutional fraud or misconduct.

Committee assignments 

 Committee on Education and Labor
 Subcommittee on Health, Employment, Labor, and Pensions
 Subcommittee on Workforce Protections
 Committee on the Judiciary
 Subcommittee on Antitrust, Commercial and Administrative Law
 Subcommittee on Crime, Terrorism and Homeland Security

Caucus memberships 

 Congressional Black Caucus
 New Democrat Coalition

Political positions

Abortion 
McBath supports legal abortion. She has said she supports funding programs that give women "autonomy over their reproductive decisions".

Health care 
McBath supports changes to the Affordable Care Act, also known as Obamacare. She opposes Medicare for All.

McBath supports expanding Medicaid in Georgia, and would lower the age of Medicare eligibility to 55.

Economy 
McBath has said she is critical of some of the 2017 Republican tax cuts, but would like to make the temporary middle-class tax cuts permanent.

McBath voted for the Raise the Wage Act, which would increase the federal minimum wage to $15 per hour. Before voting for the bill, the centrist New Democrat coalition (of which McBath is a part) secured some changes: a longer timeline to phase in the wage increases, and provisions that would pause wage increases if a federal study shows adverse economic impacts.

Gun control 
McBath initially decided to run for Congress because she believed the government was not doing enough to prevent gun violence. She supports universal background checks before purchasing a firearm, as well as red flag laws to keep guns out of the hands of people at risk of violence.

During the 2018 election, McBath vowed to respect Second Amendment rights. She also promised to push for "implementing background checks for all firearm purchases; raising the minimum age to purchase a gun to 21 years of age; working to defeat conceal carry reciprocity measures; and introducing legislation to keep guns out of the hands of domestic abusers and other criminals."

Immigration
McBath opposes abolishing the Immigration and Customs Enforcement agency (ICE).

Donald Trump
Before the Trump-Ukraine scandal, McBath had been cautious about impeaching President Donald Trump, or opposed it outright. For instance, in the aftermath of the Mueller investigation, McBath was one of 137 Democrats to vote to kill an impeachment resolution.

In October 2019, McBath voted in favor of launching an impeachment inquiry into Trump. She sits on the House Judiciary Committee, which has been tasked with handling some impeachment-related business. During a town hall event, she said she had felt "furious" about "the lack of accountability" from the Trump administration, due to what she called a lack of responsiveness to congressional subpoenas. At the same event, she said, "I don't like having to [participate in the impeachment process]. ... I don't want to have to say this about our President of the United States and the White House."

On December 18, 2019, McBath voted for articles of impeachment against Trump on the House Judiciary Committee.

Joe Biden

As of August 2021, McBath had voted in line with President Joe Biden's stated position 100% of the time.

Electoral history

Personal life 
McBath grew up in a military family; her father, brother, nephew and cousin all served in the US military in some capacity. McBath has had breast cancer twice. She is married to Curtis McBath. They live in Marietta.

In 1993, McBath was rushed to the emergency room while pregnant with her first son, Lucien. She suffered a fetal demise and was admitted to the hospital to deliver Lucien naturally. A year later, she was pregnant again and gave birth to her son Jordan. McBath is a Christian and named her son after the River Jordan in the Bible. In 2012, Davis was murdered.

See also
 List of African-American United States representatives
 Politics of Georgia
 Women in the United States House of Representatives
 Doreen Lawrence

References

Further reading

External links 

 U.S. House website
Lucy McBath for Congress campaign website

 

|-

|-

1960 births
Activists from Georgia (U.S. state)
African-American activists
African-American members of the United States House of Representatives
African-American people in Georgia (U.S. state) politics
African-American women in politics
American gun control activists
Democratic Party members of the United States House of Representatives from Georgia (U.S. state)
Female members of the United States House of Representatives
Flight attendants
Living people
People from Joliet, Illinois
People from Marietta, Georgia
Women in Georgia (U.S. state) politics
Virginia State University alumni
21st-century American women
21st-century African-American women
20th-century African-American people
20th-century African-American women